Jones Creek is a stream in the U.S. state of South Dakota.

Jones Creek has the name of a pioneer hunter.

See also
List of rivers of South Dakota

References

Rivers of Harding County, South Dakota
Rivers of South Dakota